Brian Charles Sutton (born 1938 in Oxford, Oxfordshire, UK) is a British botanist, phytopathologist, mycologist, known as one of the world's leading experts in coelomycete classification. He was the president of the British Mycological Society for the academic year 1985–1986.

Biography
Sutton graduated in 1959 with a B.Sc. in botany from the Imperial College London, which was part of the University of London (until July 2007). In August 1959 he was appointed Assistant Mycologist at Kew's Commonwealth Mycological Institute (renamed in 1986 the International Mycological Institute and in 1998 merged into CAB International). There his mentors were Edmund William Mason (1890–1975), Frederick Claude Deighton (1903–1992), and Martin Beazor Ellis (1911–1996). His superiors offered Sutton the choice of specialty as either rusts or coelomycetes. He chose the latter and was registered at Imperial College London for a Ph.D. on the genus Colletotrichum. In 1964 he completed his doctorate in mycology and phytopathology. He was employed at the mycological institute for his entire career, with a long sabbatical leave from 1965 to 1969 working as a research scientist in Winnipeg for Canada's Department of Forestry and a sabbatical year in 1986 in Australia. At the International Institute of Mycology, Sutton was appointed in 1976 Principal Mycologist and in 1990 Deputy Director. In 1995, partly out of concern for his wife's failing eyesight, he took early retirement from the institute.

His 696-page book The Coelomycetes (Commonwealth Mycological Institute, 1980) is an important reference, which was a major advance for coelomycete identification. He served as an editor for the Transactions of the British Mycological Society. The Natural History Museum, London has some of the specimens collected by Sutton.

See also
 Sarcostroma

Selected publications

Articles
  See (Pyrenopeziza brassicae and Brassica napus.)
  (See phialide.)
  (Hendersonula toruloidea is a synonym for Neoscytalidium dimidiatum.)
  (See Quercus ilex.)
  (See Dryas octopetala.)
  (See Manilkara bidentata.)
 
 
  (See forb.)

Books and monographs
  (See Eucalyptus. The genus Harknessia is named in honor of H. W. Harkness.)
 
  abstract

References

1938 births
Living people
Alumni of Imperial College London
British botanists
British mycologists
British phytopathologists
Presidents of the British Mycological Society